Toxopsiella is a genus of South Pacific araneomorph spiders in the family Cycloctenidae, and was first described by Raymond Robert Forster in 1964.

Species
 it contains twelve species, all found in New Zealand:
Toxopsiella alpina Forster, 1964 – New Zealand
Toxopsiella australis Forster, 1964 – New Zealand
Toxopsiella centralis Forster, 1964 – New Zealand
Toxopsiella dugdalei Forster, 1964 – New Zealand
Toxopsiella horningi Forster, 1979 – New Zealand
Toxopsiella lawrencei Forster, 1964 (type) – New Zealand
Toxopsiella medialis Forster, 1964 – New Zealand
Toxopsiella minuta Forster, 1964 – New Zealand
Toxopsiella nelsonensis Forster, 1979 – New Zealand
Toxopsiella orientalis Forster, 1964 – New Zealand
Toxopsiella parrotti Forster, 1964 – New Zealand
Toxopsiella perplexa Forster, 1964 – New Zealand

References

Araneomorphae genera
Cycloctenidae
Spiders of New Zealand
Taxa named by Raymond Robert Forster